Chug-a-Lug may refer to:
"Chug-a-Lug" (Roger Miller song)
"Chug-A-Lug" (Beach Boys song)